Common names: Anaimalai earth snake, Anamally earth snake, Ponachi shieldtail
Uropeltis macrorhyncha is a species of nonvenomous snake in the family Uropeltidae. The species is endemic to India. There are no subspecies that are recognized as being valid.

Geographic range
U. macrorhyncha is found in southern India in the Western Ghats: Anaimalai Hills, Madura District.

The type locality given is "Anamullay Mountains, 4,000 feet elevation."

Also, Beddome, 1886, gives a type locality of "Anamallays, dense forests above Ponachi, at an elevation of 4000 feet.

Habitat

Description
The dorsum of U. macrorhyncha is brown. There is a yellow streak from the mouth along each side of the neck. There is a yellow streak on each side of the tail, connected by a yellow crossbar across the vent. The venter is brown mixed with yellow.

The dorsal scales are in 19 rows behind the head, in 17 rows at midbody. The type specimen, a female, has 213 ventrals, and 6 subcaudals.

The snout is acutely pointed, strongly projecting. The rostral is strongly laterally compressed, keeled above, ½ the length of the shielded part of the head. The nasals are narrowly in contact behind the rostral. The frontal is as broad as long. The eye is very small, less than ⅓ the length of the ocular shield. The diameter of body goes 38 times into the total length. The ventrals are slightly less than two times as large as the contiguous scales. The end of the tail is subtruncate, the keeled dorsal portion small and rather flat, the scales with 3-5 strong keels. The terminal scute has two points.

Reproduction
U. macrorhyncha is ovoviviparous.

References

Further reading

Beddome, R.H. (1877). "Descriptions of three new Snakes of the Family Uropeltidæ from Southern India". Proceedings of the Zoological Society of London 1877: 167–168. (Silybura macrorhyncha, new species, pp. 167–168).
Beddome, R.H. (1886). "An Account of the Earth-Snakes of the Peninsula of India and Ceylon". Annals and Magazine of Natural History, Fifth Series 17: 3–33. (Silybura macrorhyncha, p. 19).
Mahendra, B.C. (1984). "Handbook of the snakes of India, Ceylon, Burma, Bangladesh and Pakistan". Annals of Zoology (Agra) 22 (B): i–xvi, 1–412.
Sharma, R.C. (2003). Handbook: Indian Snakes. Kolkata: Zoological Survey of India. 292 pp. .
Smith, M.A. (1943). The Fauna of British India, Ceylon and Burma, Including the Whole of the Indo-Chinese Sub-Region. Reptilia and Amphibia. Vol. III.—Serpentes. London: Secretary of State for India. (Taylor and Francis, printers). xii + 583 pp. (Uropeltis macrorhynchus, new combination, p. 78).
Whitaker, R.; Captain, A. (2008). Snakes of India: The Field Guide. Chennai: Draco Books. 495 pp. .

External links

Uropeltidae
Reptiles of India
Endemic fauna of the Western Ghats
Reptiles described in 1877
Taxa named by Richard Henry Beddome